Kaspichan Municipality is a municipality (obshtina) in Shumen Province, Northeastern Bulgaria. It is named after its administrative centre, the town of Kaspichan.

The area is crossed from east to west by the eastern operating section of Hemus motorway which is planned to connect the port of Varna with the capital Sofia.

Settlements 

Kaspichan Municipality includes the following 9 places (towns are shown in bold):

Demography 
The following table illustrates the population change over the last four decades.

Ethnic composition
According to the 2011 census, among those who answered the optional question on ethnic identification, the ethnic composition of the municipality was the following:

Religion
According to the latest Bulgarian census of 2011, the religious composition, among those who answered the optional question on religious identification, was the following:

See also
Provinces of Bulgaria
Municipalities of Bulgaria
List of cities and towns in Bulgaria

References

External links
 Official website 

Municipalities in Shumen Province